Sorso is a comune (municipality) of c. 14,700 inhabitants in the province of Sassari in the Italian region Sardinia, located about  north of Sassari.

Overview
Sorso is a tourist resort facing the Gulf of Asinara. Apart tourism, the economy is mostly based on agriculture. The local dialect is a variant of Sassarese.

The judike (King) Barisone III of Torres was assassinated at Sorso during a peasant revolt in 1236.

References

External links

Cities and towns in Sardinia